Bhadrak railway station is a passenger railway station serves Bhadrak district in Indian state of Odisha. It is situated on the howrah chennai main railline. It comes under (NSG3) railway stations category of India.

Outline
It functions within the jurisdiction of Khurda Road railway division. It is the nearest railhead for Dhamra Port.

It was renovated recently in the year 2018-2019 and got a brand new look and the platform length also increased too.

History
Bengal Nagpur Railway was working on both the Howrah–Kharagpur and Kharagpur–Cuttack lines, completed the bridge over the Rupnarayan in 1900 and the Mahanadi in 1901, thus completing the through connection between Chennai and Kolkata.

Passenger amenities
Bhadrak railway station has computerized reservation system (CRS), dormitory, cloak room, refreshment room, tourist information counter, post office (RMS) sliding steps for specially abled persons and ATM.

References

Railway stations in India opened in 1896
Railway stations in Bhadrak district